Sijua is a census town in Dhanbad district, Jharkhand, India.

Sijua may also refer to:

Sijua (moth), a genus of moths of the family Thyrididae from Africa 
Sijua, Jhargram, a village in Binpur I CD Block, Jhargram district, West Bengal, India
Sijua Area, operational area of BCCL

Sijua, Bokaro is a census town in Bokaro district, Jharkhand, India.
Sijhua, a village in Chas CD Block, Bokaro district, Jharkhand, India